John Joseph Maguire (December 11, 1904 – July 6, 1989) was an American clergyman of the Roman Catholic Church. He served as auxiliary bishop (1959–1965) and coadjutor archbishop (1965–1980) in the Archdiocese of New York.

Early life and education
John Maguire was born in New York City to James and Ellen Marie (née Shea) Maguire. He attended Regis High School and Cathedral College in his native city, and began his studies for the priesthood at St. Joseph's Seminary in Yonkers. Two years later he was sent by Cardinal Patrick Joseph Hayes to continue his studies at the Pontifical North American College in Rome.

Priesthood
On December 22, 1928, Maguire was ordained a priest by Archbishop Giuseppe Palica in the Basilica of St. John Lateran. Upon his return to New York, his knowledge of Italian led to his first assignment as a curate at St. Patrick's Old Cathedral, which had a large Italian American congregation. He served as assistant chancellor of the Archdiocese of New York from 1940 to 1945, advancing to vice-chancellor in 1945 and chancellor in 1947. He was named a Domestic Prelate in 1948. In 1953, he became vicar general of the archdiocese, a post in which he remained until 1980.

Episcopacy
On May 16, 1959, Maguire was appointed Auxiliary Bishop of New York and Titular Bishop of Antiphrae by Pope John XXIII. He received his episcopal consecration on the following June 29 from Cardinal Francis Spellman, with Bishops Joseph Francis Flannelly and James Griffiths serving as co-consecrators, at St. Patrick's Cathedral. He assumed as his episcopal motto: Tutam Reclude Semitam (Latin: "Disclose a way of life free of danger"), taken from the hymn Praeclara custos virginum.  Known as a champion for racial justice, he encouraged New York Catholics to participate in the 1963 March on Washington, during which Dr. Martin Luther King Jr., delivered his historic "I Have a Dream" speech. He later joined other religious leaders in an amicus curiae brief asking the U.S. Supreme Court to find racial discrimination in the sale of housing unconstitutional. In addition to his advocacy for the Civil Rights Movement, he was an outspoken supporter of ecumenism and frequently participated in joint services with clergymen from other faiths. He also took a special interest in the Hispanic Catholic community, learning Spanish and often traveling to Puerto Rico.

On September 15, 1965, Maguire was named Coadjutor Archbishop of New York and Titular Archbishop of Tabalta by Pope Paul VI. His appointment placed New York in the unique situation of having two archbishops at the same time. A coadjutor bishop is usually named when the ordinary of a diocese is ill or close to retirement, or when a diocese is particularly large; the 76-year-old Cardinal Spellman had recently undergone prostate surgery. However, unlike most coadjutor bishops, Maguire did not possess the automatic right of succession. Following Spellman's death in December 1967, Maguire was elected by the archdiocesan board of consultors to serve as Apostolic Administrator of New York until the appointment of a replacement. In the interim he was mentioned as a top candidate to fill the vacant post, but it ultimately went to Auxiliary Bishop Terence Cooke in March 1968.

Later life and death
After reaching the mandatory retirement age of 75, Maguire resigned as coadjutor archbishop on January 8, 1980. During his retirement, he resided at St. Patrick's Cathedral. He died on July 6, 1989, at St. Vincent's Hospital, aged 84. Upon his death, Cardinal John Joseph O'Connor said, "For myself, Archbishop Maguire was the linchpin which linked the archdiocese of yesterday with the archdiocese of today." He is interred near the deceased Archbishops of New York in the crypt beneath the main altar of St. Patrick's Cathedral.

References

1904 births
1989 deaths
Clergy from New York City
20th-century American Roman Catholic titular archbishops
20th-century Roman Catholic archbishops in the United States
Participants in the Second Vatican Council
Burials at St. Patrick's Cathedral (Manhattan)
Regis High School (New York City) alumni